Bowman Creek is a creek in north west New South Wales, Australia. Bowman Creek is 9.12 km long.

References 

Rivers of New South Wales
Murray-Darling basin